The Franco-German border separates France and Germany and has a length of , about half of it along the Rhine.

History
The Franco-German border can be traced back to the 17th century, and the various treaties following the Thirty Years' War (1618–1648), starting with the Treaty of Westphalia (1648) and the Treaty of Nijmegen (1678–1679), marking the Rhine as the frontier between the Kingdom of France, and the different German states. The actual border was determined in the Congress of Vienna in 1815. The border then changed after the French defeat during the Franco-Prussian War (1870-1871), where the French Third Republic was forced to yield Alsace-Lorraine to the new German Empire in 1871. The territory was then returned to France 48 years later after the Treaty of Versailles in 1919. The border changed again in 1941 when Nazi Germany de facto annexed the region (without international legal recognition, or treaty). The current border was re-established after the defeat of Nazi Germany in World War II.

In 2019, German authorities instituted extended border checks. These checks resulted in 178 people who had been banned from entering Germany being denied entry. 1,177 people on the wanted list were arrested, there were 1,235 breaches of residency laws, 406 breaches against narcotics laws, 205 breaches of weapons laws, 47 cases of falsified documents, and 19 people with extremist backgrounds were hindered from entering Germany. Most of these were along the borders to France and Austria.

Route
The border follows the Upper Rhine from the tripoint (Dreiländereck) with the French-Swiss and the German-Swiss borders at Basel, passing between Strasbourg and Offenburg. The Rhine forms the eastern border of Alsace on the French side and the western border of Baden-Württemberg on the German side.

Upstream of Karlsruhe, the border leaves the Rhine, cutting westward to  forming the northern border of  Alsace and Lorraine on the French side, and the southern border of Rhineland-Palatinate and Saarland on the German side. It passes Saarbrücken, Petite-Rosselle, Freyming-Merlebach, Creutzwald (where it follows the Bist for a short stretch), Überherrn, and meets the E29 before it  terminates at the French-Luxembourgian-German tripoint on the Moselle, near the village of Schengen, Luxembourg (chosen as the symbolic site for the signing of the Schengen Agreement between France, Germany, and the Benelux countries in 1985).

References

See also
Territorial evolution of Germany
Territorial evolution of France
France–Germany relations
Rhine crisis
Die Wacht am Rhein

 
1648 establishments in France
1648 establishments in the Holy Roman Empire
European Union internal borders
1648 in international relations
Borders of France
Borders of Germany
International borders